is a Japanese manga series by Osamu Nishi. It has been serialized in Akita Shoten's shōnen manga magazine Weekly Shōnen Champion since March 2017. As of March 2023, the series has been collected in thirty-one tankōbon volumes.

An anime television series adaptation produced by Bandai Namco Pictures, aired on NHK Educational TV between October 2019 and March 2020, followed by a second season from April to September 2021, and a third season from October 2022 to March 2023. As of September 2020, the manga had over 5 million copies in circulation.

Plot
The story follows Iruma Suzuki, a 14-year-old human boy who is sold to a demon by his lazy, selfish and neglectful parents. The demon, known as Sullivan, takes Iruma to the Demon World and officially adopts him as his grandson. He enrolls Iruma in the Babyls School for Demons where he is the headmaster and where Iruma quickly befriends the demons Alice Asmodeus and Clara Valac. However, Sullivan tells Iruma to never reveal that he is human since he will be eaten if anyone finds out. Iruma then vows to blend in during his time in the demon world, although he only stands out because of all the situations and adventures that arise. By his second year Iruma turns 15 years old.

Characters

Main characters

 Iruma is a 14-year-old human boy who was sold by his parents to the Demon Lord Sullivan, who adopts him as his grandson. Iruma’s parents neglected him (to ridiculously extreme ways), so he was unable to attend normal school regularly in the human world. From a young age, he experienced a variety of situations and had many jobs in order to support himself. These odd experiences helped him develop great adaptability, survival skills and agility. 
 Iruma is also very kind which makes him gullible to requests as he genuinely helps people even at his own inconvenience. He attends the demon school by concealing his true identity as a human. Despite his earnest efforts to keep a low profile, he frequently stands out among his peers partly because of misunderstandings and also from Sullivan's eccentricity. Iruma later learns to come to terms with his popularity; he becomes friends with Alice and Clara and they soon form an unlikely trio. He is highly admired by his fellow classmates and acquaintances.
 During the Demon Rank placement exams, his rank was immeasurable because the ranking owl gave him the Ring of Gluttony from a Demonic Prophecy instead of a rank badge, so he was placed in the lowest rank: Aleph (Rank 1). Also, Iruma accidentally made his homeroom teacher, Kalego, his familiar. After some initial deliberation, Iruma resolves to work hard to get promoted in rank and to make his new family proud. He wants to protect those he really cares for. He is now currently ranked as He (Rank 5).

 Iruma's best friend and loyal companion after he lost a battle to Iruma (who dodged all of his attacks) on his first day at Babyls. Primarily referred to by his family name, or "Azz" for short. His rank and power exceed those of most freshmen, and he has the ability to wield fire. He was the valedictorian of the freshman class, with the highest grades on the entrance exam. At first, he begrudgingly played with Clara upon Iruma's request, but later also becomes her best friend. He is generally very calm, but when Iruma is involved, he becomes more emotional, even fighting with Clara so he can get Iruma's attention. His familiar is a white Gorgon snake who also wields fire. He is now currently ranked as He (Rank 5) as of Volume 25, chapter 266.

 A highly odd (even by demon standards) and energetic Valac girl who constantly wants to play. Her bloodline ability allows her to pull out anything she has seen from her pockets, and she had to bribe other demons with snacks to play with her until she met Iruma. Iruma told Clara he doesn't need anything since he truly enjoyed playing with her, which boosts Clara's confidence and she soon becomes best friends with Iruma and Alice. She later also develops feelings for Iruma and vows to make Iruma enchanted by her. Her familiar is a rare indescribable creature called Falfal and she is currently ranked as Daleth (Rank 4)

 A fox-eared demon who is the president of the student council of the Babyls School for Demons. Although she is dignified and is highly respected by the student population, she is also a girl who is secretly a fan of the human world, especially a romance manga named “First Love Memories”. Ameri was the first demon to suspect that Iruma is a human despite the common belief in Demon World that humans are mythical. She later confirms her suspicions and becomes friends with Iruma and develops strong feelings for him, although Iruma is not aware that she knows he is a human. Her rank is Vau (Rank 6), the highest of any known student.

 Iruma's homeroom teacher. Not knowing Iruma was human when teaching students how to summon familiars, Kalego was summoned by him by accident due to his mark being on the summon sheet. His familiar form is that of a small owl-like creature with bat wings and small black horns. His rank is Cheth (Rank 8), the highest of any demon teacher at the Babyls School for Demons, with the exception of the headmaster, Sullivan, and his friend, Balam Shichirou, who also holds the same rank. Seemingly aloof and skeptic, in reality, he deeply cares for his students and their well-being; though he tends to twist situations so he can punish the Misfit Class for amusement.

 The headmaster of the Babyls School for Demons and a demon who appears as an older man. He is one of the three demons in the Demon World who ranks as a Tet (Rank 9) and is one of the most powerful and influential demons in society. Thus, he is a possible candidate for the new Demon King since the disappearance of the last Demon King. Sullivan is also the demon that buys and subsequently adopts Iruma as his grandson. He did this so he could fill the void he felt every time he went to a meeting with his fellow Tet ranking friends, who said outstanding things about their own grandchildren. Sullivan is also responsible for granting Iruma the ability to read and understand the demon language through magic. He adores his new grandson and showers him with gifts and attention. In an effort to help Iruma blend in, he placed him along with Alice and Clara in the Abnormal Class; under the belief that strange students would camouflage him.

 Lord Sullivan's assistant, who appears as an androgynous cat-eared demon and also works as a secretary of sorts. Opera lives in the same house as Sullivan and Iruma, and manages the laundry, cooking, timetabling and transport for the two of them. They have a master-servant relationship, with Sullivan relying heavily on Opera's abilities and advice to keep him on track and away from distractions. Opera is one of the few demons that knows Iruma's true identity. Opera's rank is currently unknown, though he might be Cheth (Rank 8). Opera, for some reason, has little to no expression of emotions on their face but rather it shows on Opera’s ears. Humorously, Opera was Kalego's senior during their tenure at Babyls as students and is the only person who Kalego genuinely seems to fear.

Misfit Class Demons

 He is the second son of the prestigious Sabnock family, with his family ability being weapon creation. He can create a weapon from anything he bites and wears a necklace of different materials around his neck. He has an intimidating appearance being roughly 8 ft. tall and very well-built, making himself the physically strongest.  He comes off as ambitious and quite open with his desires. His goal is to become the next Demon King purely because it is the highest rank one can achieve in the Demon World. During the entrance ceremony, he attacked a teacher believing it would be the quickest way to gain a higher rank, but it was really the quickest way to being in the Abnormal class. He gains respect for Iruma after the Demon Rank placement exams and views him as his rival, although power-wise he clashes with Alice the most. His familiar is a Kelpie and his rank is Daleth (Rank 4).

 Her family has the ability to manipulate ice, thus she is weak to heat and can pass out if she overuses her ability or gets too excited. She secretly lives a double-life as the evi-dol Kuromu. As a student, she wears special enchanted glasses that prevent the other students from recognizing her aku-dol identity. She joined the abnormal class due to her work schedule. Her rank is Daleth (Rank 4) and her familiar is a Snow Fox.

 He is the second son of the Andro family and his family's ability is Furtive Glance (Pit). It simultaneously allows him to identify objects on a target and the shortest route to steal them as well as to extend his fingers like snakes to steal things. He joined the Abnormal class due to his habit to pickpocket other students on the day of the entrance ceremony. His rank is Daleth (Rank 4) and his familiar is a Split Wolf.

 An elf-like demon who is a gambling enthusiast and enjoys the thrills of high stakes. He was placed in the Abnormal class due to a gambling game gone wrong on the day of the entrance ceremony. Shax's bloodline magic is Sense Stealer (Controller) which allows him to steal and use one of his target's five senses, turning the corresponding organ on his target black. If he pushes himself, Shax can take two senses at once. His familiar is unknown and his rank is Daleth (Rank 4).

 A tall beautiful humanoid demon. Her bloodline magic is called "Full Love Gauge" which causes those well-disposed to her to try and gain her favor, although it cannot be used on people she likes. She is not good at studying and has a strong longing for pure love; she's a romantic at heart, having desired said love since childhood. Her familiar is unknown and Her rank is Daleth (Rank 4).

 A perverted owl-like demon who is ironically a gentleman. He was placed in the Abnormal class due to his non-stop sexual harassment of other female students. Caim's Bloodline magic is a universal translator which lets him translate any languages of any species . His familiar is unknown and his rank is Daleth (Rank 4).

 A demon that is constantly napping on a cloud. He believes that "the minimum number of attendance days is good," and was placed in the Abnormal class for constantly either skipping or sleeping. His Family Power is called "My Area" and allows him to detect and control nearby physical surfaces. His familiar is unknown and his rank is Daleth (Rank 4).

 A demon whose face and body are covered in white hair. Gaap speaks in an old-fashioned manner, similar to a samurai. He enjoys training with his sword, and he can perform wind slashes using his and his bloodline magic, "WindWhirl". His familiar is unknown and his rank is Daleth (Rank 4).

 A demon with a lion-like face. He is actually very book-smart known as “ The Beast King Of Knowledge”. He placed 1st place in the Lecture test and got his first rank advancement. He mostly speaks in high-vocabulary and usually use quotes in his speech. His Familiar is called Smart Hawk and his rank is Daleth (Rank 4).

 A quiet demon that doesn't stick out very much. Despite his initial invisibility to the rest of the Abnormal Class, he is quite chatty when he opens up. Purson's Bloodline magic is detection warding, allowing him to disappear to ensure nobody detects him. His rank is Daleth (Rank 4). (He has not appeared in the anime yet, so no voice actors are available.)

Other Demons

 A demon girl that was saved by Iruma during the day of the entrance ceremony. She has a crush on Iruma, but never gets to talk to him after the familiar summoning ceremony due to being placed in a different class. Her familiar is a cloudy fox-like creature with bat wings.

 A member of the student council at the Babyls School for Demons.

 A member of the student council at the Babyls School for Demons.

 A magically-weak third-year student who heads the Magical Apparatus Battler but got arrested for trying to destroy the school during Battler Party's Eve Countdown, leaving Iruma, Alice and Clara to take over the battler. He is also the leader of a demon criminal group known as the “Six Fingers", whose main goal is to return the Demon World to a savage and chaotic state. According to him, Iruma Suzuki is his destined enemy. His bloodline ability is Barrier and his rank was Bet (Rank 2) when he was arrested.

 A teacher at the Babyls School for Demons. He is good friends with Kalego as they were classmates when they were younger. Despite his looks, he is a very kind person. Balam is also one of the very few demons who know Iruma is a human. Balam helps Iruma with his classes by turning the lessons into storybooks; a hobby of his, being a good enough author to the point his stories can bring the readers to tears from how touching they are. He is also one of the demons in the school that is rank Chet (Rank 8). His Family Power is called “ Buzzer “ which lets him detect any lies or untruths.

Media

Manga

The series has been serialized in Akita Shoten's shōnen manga magazine Weekly Shōnen Champion since March 2, 2017. Akita Shoten has collected its chapters into individual tankōbon volumes. The first volume was released on July 7, 2017. As of March 8, 2023, thirty-one volumes have been released.

At Anime Expo 2022, Kodansha USA announced that they licensed the series for English publication.

Spin-off
A spin-off, titled , started serialization in Weekly Shōnen Champion on January 9, 2020. The first tankōbon volume was released on June 8, 2020. As of March 8, 2023, thirteen volumes have been released.

Anime

An anime television series adaptation was announced in 10th issue of Weekly Shōnen Champion alongside Beastars on February 7, 2019. The 23-episode series is animated by Bandai Namco Pictures and directed by Makoto Moriwaki, with Kazuyuki Fudeyasu handling series composition, and Akimitsu Honma composing the music. NHK and NHK Enterprises are credited for production. The series aired from October 5, 2019, to March 7, 2020, on NHK Educational TV. Da Pump performed the series' opening theme song "Magical Babyrinth," while Yū Serizawa performed the series' ending theme song . Crunchyroll and Muse Communication are streaming the series in their selected regions. A second season was announced and aired for 21 episodes from April 17, 2021, to September 11, 2021. The staff returned to reprise their roles. Da Pump performed the second season's opening theme song "No! No! Satisfaction!", while Amatsuki performed the second season's ending theme song .

On May 18, 2020, it was announced Sentai Filmworks picked up the home video rights.

On September 11, 2021, the Twitter account for the anime announced that a third season is in development. It aired from October 8, 2022 to March 4, 2023. Fantastics from Exile Tribe will perform the opening theme song , while Wednesday Campanella will perform the ending theme song .

Reception
As of January 2020, the first fifteen volumes of the manga had over 2.5 million copies in circulation. As of September 2020, the manga had over 5 million copies in circulation.

References

External links
 

2019 anime television series debuts
Akita Shoten manga
Anime series based on manga
Bandai Namco Pictures
Comedy anime and manga
Crunchyroll anime
Demons in anime and manga
Fantasy anime and manga
Muse Communication
NHK original programming
School life in anime and manga
Sentai Filmworks
Shōnen manga